Enzo Jérémy Le Fée (born 3 February 2000) is a French professional footballer who plays as a midfielder for  club Lorient.

Club career
Le Fée began his football career in the youth academy of Kéryado, before moving to the youth academy of Lorient at the age of 8. On 13 November 2018, he signed his first professional contract with Lorient. He made his professional debut for Lorient in a 0–0 Ligue 2 tie with Sochaux on 10 May 2019.

Honours 
Lorient

 Ligue 2: 2019–20

References

External links

2000 births
Living people
Sportspeople from Lorient
Footballers from Brittany
French footballers
France youth international footballers
Association football midfielders
FC Lorient players
Ligue 1 players
Ligue 2 players
Championnat National 2 players
Olympic footballers of France
Footballers at the 2020 Summer Olympics